is a Japanese footballer currently playing as a forward for Roasso Kumamoto.

Career statistics

Club
.

Notes

References

2002 births
Living people
Association football people from Kumamoto Prefecture
Japanese footballers
Association football forwards
J2 League players
J3 League players
Roasso Kumamoto players